Agonopterix dammersi is a moth in the family Depressariidae. It was described by Clarke in 1947. It is found in North America, where it has been recorded from southern Arizona and California.

The larvae feed on Senecio douglasii and Eriophyllum species.

References

Moths described in 1947
Agonopterix
Moths of North America